Taaqat is a 1995 Indian Hindi-language romantic crime film directed and written by Talat Jani, starring Dharmendra, Shatrughan Sinha, Kajol and Vikas Bhalla. It revolves on two influential gangsters working for opposite political parties.

Cast 
Cast adapted from Box Office India:

 Dharmendra as Shakti Singh
 Shatrughan Sinha as Bhau
 Kajol as Kavita
 Vikas Bhalla as Aklakh
 Farah Naaz as Savitri
 Kader Khan as Master Dinanath
 Mukesh Khanna as Khushwant Singh Bedi
 Aasif Sheikh as Maniya
 Raju Shrestha as Devdas
 Dinesh Hingoo as Anirudh
 Ishrat Ali as Anna
 Rajendra Gupta as Anil Rege
 Deep Dhillon as Irfan
 Suhas Joshi as Dinanath's wife

Soundtrack 
The song Hun Huna, tuned by Anand–Milind, written by Sameer and rendered by Kumar Sanu and Poornima, was popular during the release.

References

External links 
 

1990s Hindi-language films
1995 crime films
1995 films
Films scored by Anand–Milind
Indian crime films
Indian romance films
Romantic crime films
Films directed by Talat Jani